Evergestis arcuatalis is a moth in the family Crambidae. It was described by George Hampson in 1900. It is found in Uzbekistan.

References

Evergestis
Moths described in 1900
Moths of Asia